ALD-52, also known as 1-acetyl-LSD, is a chemical analogue of lysergic acid diethylamide (LSD). It was originally discovered by Albert Hofmann in 1957 but was not widely studied until the rise in popularity of psychedelics in the 1960s.

Effects 
In Entry 26 of his compendium TiHKAL, which discussed LSD, chemist Alexander Shulgin touched briefly on the subject of ALD-52. His comments there are vague, second-hand accounts saying doses in the 50–175 µg range have resulted in various conclusions. One account found that there was less visual distortion than with LSD and it seemed to produce less anxiety and tenseness and that it was somewhat less potent. Another informant claimed it was more effective in increasing blood pressure. Yet another informant could not tell them apart.

Safety 
In The Hallucinogens by Hoffer and Osmond (1967), ALD-52 is listed as having a lower (approximately 1/5) intravenous toxicity (in rabbits), a lower (approximately 1/8) pyretogenic effect, an equal psychological effect in humans, and double the "antiserotonin" effect as compared with LSD. Human experiments have not been well documented.

History 
In a Reddit AMA  with the director of the movie The Sunshine Makers, Tim Scully says:

"The Orange Sunshine we delivered was LSD 25. ALD 52 was an ill-advised desperate defense strategy that failed miserably... The story of Orange Sunshine is complicated by the fact that The Brotherhood distributed LSD from more than one manufacturer as Orange Sunshine. "Nick and I made the original Orange Sunshine in Windsor. That was the last lab I worked in making LSD. Ron Stark managed several LSD labs in Europe and most of his output was tableted and sold as Orange Sunshine. At least some of the LSD that his labs made was not pure."

Tim Scully has confirmed that the speculation below is incorrect. 

The Orange Sunshine variety of LSD that was widely available in California through 1968 and 1969 was produced in the Sonoma County underground chemistry lab of Tim Scully and Nicholas Sand. It was shut down by the police, and Scully was arrested and prosecuted. This resulted in the first drug analogue trial, where Scully claimed that he and his partners did nothing illegal, because they were producing ALD-52, which was not an illicit drug. However, as the prosecution claimed, there were problems with such a rationale—ALD-52 was claimed to readily undergo hydrolysis  to LSD, and secondly, the synthesis of ALD-52 required LSD. (The second point was based on the methods available in the scientific literature at the time). Scully was convicted and served time in prison.

Legal status

Austria 
ALD-52 is technically not illegal but it may fall in the NPSG (Neue-Psychoaktive-Substanzen-Gesetz Österreich) as an analogue of LSD

Denmark 
ALD-52 is not listed as an illegal substance in Denmark as of April, 2019, and its chemical class 'lysergamide' is not banned under the Analogue Act (Some LSD analogues are, however, prohibited).

Finland 
ALD-52 is labeled a controlled psychoactive substance in Finland as of 2014.

Germany 
ALD-52 is controlled under the NpSG as of July 18, 2019. Production and import with the aim to place it on the market, administration to another person and trading is punishable. Possession is illegal but not penalized.

Latvia 
ALD-52 is illegal in Latvia. Although it isn't officially scheduled, it is controlled as an LSD structural analog due to an amendment made on June 1, 2015.

Romania 
1P-LSD is illegal to produce or sell in Romania. It is not included directly in the list of controlled substances, but it is included in an analogue act. However, it is not, as of yet, classified as illegal to use.

Singapore 
ALD-52 is a class A controlled drug, and is illegal to traffic, manufacture, import, export, possess, or consume in Singapore as of December 1, 2019, punishable with a minimum of five years’ imprisonment and five strokes of the cane.

Switzerland 
Since March 2018, ALD-52 is illegal in Switzerland and has been put in the RS 812.121.11.

United Kingdom 
On June 10, 2014 the UK Advisory Council on the Misuse of Drugs (ACMD) recommended that ALD-52 be specifically named in the UK Misuse of Drugs Act as a class A drug despite not identifying it as ever having been sold or any harm associated with its use. The UK Home office accepted this advice and announced a ban of the substance to be enacted on 6 January 2015 as part of The Misuse of Drugs Act 1971 (Amendment) (No. 2) Order 2014.

United States 
ALD-52 is unscheduled in the United States. It may be considered an analogue of LSD, a Schedule I drug under the Controlled Substances Act. As such, the sale for human consumption or the use for illicit non-medical or scientific use could be prosecuted as crimes under the Federal Analogue Act however could be legal for medical and research uses like a research chemical.

See also 
 Lysergic acid diethylamide (LSD)
 1cP-LSD
 1B-LSD
 1P-LSD
 1V-LSD
 1cP-AL-LAD
 AL-LAD
 ETH-LAD
 PRO-LAD
 LSM-775
 LSZ
 O-Acetylpsilocin (4-AcO-DMT)

References

External links 
 Entry #26 from TiHKAL
 everything2
 Lycaeum
 White Light

Lysergamides
Euphoriants
Psychedelic drugs
Serotonin receptor agonists
Entheogens
Designer drugs
Acetamides